"I Cry" is the fourth and final single from Ja Rule's second studio album, Rule 3:36. The song samples "Cry Together" by The O'Jays. This was also the final collaborative single by Ja Rule and former associate, Lil' Mo. It was after this release that Irv Gotti decided that Ja Rule should work with Ashanti.

This song became an urban hit during the late spring of 2001, peaking at number 40 on the Billboard Hot 100, number 25 on the Rap Charts, and number 11 on the Billboard Hot R&B charts.

In 2008, the song was used as a sample in LL Cool J's record, "Cry", which also happened to feature Lil' Mo.

Charts

Weekly charts

Year-end charts

References

2000 songs
2001 singles
Ja Rule songs
Lil' Mo songs
Song recordings produced by Irv Gotti
Songs written by Irv Gotti
Songs written by Kenny Gamble
Songs written by Leon Huff
Songs written by Lil' Mo
Songs written by Ja Rule
Def Jam Recordings singles